NBC 12 may refer to one of the following television stations in the United States:

Current affiliates
KBMT-DT2, Beaumont/Port Arthur, Texas
KOBR, Roswell, New Mexico
Satellite of KOB in Albuquerque
KPNX, Phoenix, Arizona
KTVH-DT, Helena, Montana
WBOY, Clarksburg, West Virginia
WICU-TV, Erie, Pennsylvania
WJFW-TV, Rhinelander/Wausau, Wisconsin
WSFA, Montgomery, Alabama
WTLV, Jacksonville, Florida
WWBT, Richmond, Virginia
WXII, Winston-Salem, North Carolina

Formerly affiliated
KEYC-TV, Mankato, Minnesota (1960 to 1961)
KCOY-TV, Santa Maria, California (1964 to 1969)
KPTV, Portland, Oregon (1957 to 1959)
KXII, Sherman, Texas (1956 to 1977)
WVUE, Wilmington, Delaware (1949 to 1955)